Wagerup is a town located in the Peel region of Western Australia just off the South Western Highway.

History
The town's name was initially spelt Waigerup or Waigeerup, derived from an Aboriginal name meaning "the place of the emu" (waitch), and was applied to a brook in the area. The same spelling was used when the railway station opened in 1896. However, by 1899, when the townsite was gazetted, the current spelling had been adopted (according to local legend, the man who painted the sign for the railway station misspelt the name).

In the mid 1970s serious community concern about impending mining in jarrah forests saw considerable protests about the construction of the Wagerup refinery. The Campaign to Save Native Forests and South West Forests Defence Foundation challenged the planned mining venture, and the conditions under which Alcoa was to be mining.

Present day
Alcoa have operated an alumina refinery in Wagerup since 1984. For years, residents and Alcoa workers have reported illnesses such as respiratory irritation, frequent nosebleeds, headaches, nausea and higher rates of cancer, as reported in numerous media outlets including the ABC's Four Corners program, although no formal causal link has ever been established. Residents in nearby Yarloop subsequently announced plans to fight the decision in the Supreme Court.

See also
 List of aluminium smelters

References

Further reading
 Hunte, H.E. (chair) (1978) Report by the Steering Committee on Research into the Effects of Bauxite Mining on the Water Resources of the Darling Range, September 1978. Perth, WA: Dept. of Industrial Development, Western Australia, 
 Lines, William J. (2006) Patriots: defending Australia's natural heritage St Lucia, Qld: University of Queensland Press.  
 Working Groups of Technical Review Committee to Hunt Steering Committee and Kelsal Steering Committee. (1976)  Research into the effects of bauxite mining in the Darling Range. Research into the effects of woodchipping in the Manjimup area, reports of Working Groups of Technical Review Committee to Hunt Steering Committee and Kelsall Steering Committee, Perth, WA: Dept. of Conservation & Environment.

External links
 Alcoa Australia website

Towns in Western Australia
Mining towns in Western Australia
Shire of Waroona